Deroy Duarte (born 4 July 1999) is a professional football player who plays as a midfielder for Fortuna Sittard in the Dutch Eredivisie. Born in the Netherlands, he represents the Cape Verde national team.

Club career
He made his Eredivisie debut for Sparta Rotterdam on 12 August 2017 in a game against VVV-Venlo.

On 12 August 2021, he signed a three-year contract with Fortuna Sittard.

International career
Born in the Netherlands, Duarte is of Cape Verdean descent. He was called up to represent the Cape Verde national team for a set of friendlies in March 2022. He debuted with Cape Verde in a 2–0 friendly win over Guadeloupe.

Personal life
He is the younger brother of Laros Duarte.

References

External links
 
 

1999 births
Living people
Footballers from Rotterdam
Cape Verdean footballers
Cape Verde international footballers
Dutch footballers
Netherlands youth international footballers
Dutch sportspeople of Cape Verdean descent
Sparta Rotterdam players
Fortuna Sittard players
Eredivisie players
Eerste Divisie players
Tweede Divisie players
Association football midfielders